Knolls Laboratory may refer to:

 GE Global Research's Knolls Laboratory, Niskayuna, New York
 Knolls Atomic Power Laboratory, Niskayuna, New York